Etidorhpa, or, the end of the earth: the strange history of a mysterious being and the account of a remarkable journey is the title of a scientific allegory or science fiction novel by John Uri Lloyd, a pharmacognocist and pharmaceutical manufacturer of Cincinnati, Ohio. Etidorhpa was published in 1895.

The word "Etidorhpa" is the backward spelling of the name "Aphrodite." The first editions of Etidorhpa were distributed privately; later editions of the book feature numerous fanciful illustrations by John Augustus Knapp. Eventually a popular success, the book had eighteen editions and was translated into seven languages. Etidorhpa literary clubs were founded in the United States, and some parents named their infant daughters Etidorhpa.

Concept
The book purports to be a manuscript dictated by a strange being named I-Am-The-Man to a man named Llewyllyn Drury. Drury's adventure culminates in a trek through a cave in Kentucky into the core of the earth. Ideas presented in Etidorhpa include practical alchemy, secret Masonic orders, the Hollow Earth theory, and the concept of transcending the physical realm.

Hollow Earth
Etidorhpa belongs to a subgenre of fiction that shares elements of science fiction, fantasy, utopian fiction, and scientific (or pseudoscientific) speculation. Jules Verne's Journey to the Center of the Earth is the most famous book of this type, though many others can be cited. It imagined another world in the center of a hollow earth.

Among John Uri Lloyd's generation, Edward Bulwer-Lytton's The Coming Race was popular and influential. During the next generation, Edgar Rice Burroughs wrote a series of Hollow Earth novels.

Drugs
Since Lloyd was a pharmacologist, his novel has provoked speculation that drug use contributed to its fantastic and visionary nature. Substances from marijuana and opium to nightshade, henbane, jimsonweed, and psilocybin mushrooms have been suggested as possibilities, although no real evidence on the matter is available.

Synopsis
Following a framing device, the book's first chapter begins the story of how Drury met the mysterious I-Am-The-Man, who reads his own manuscript account of his adventures to Drury over many sessions. The mysterious stranger, also known as The-Man-Who-Did-It, relates events that supposedly occurred thirty years earlier, during the early part of the 19th century. 
 
By his account, the speaker is kidnapped by fellow members of a secret society, because he is suspected to be a threat to their secrecy. (This was likely based on the 1826 kidnapping of William Morgan and the start of the Anti-Masonry movement.) I-Am-The-Man is taken to a cave in Kentucky; there he is led by a cavern dweller on a long subterranean journey. It becomes an inner journey of the spirit as much as a geographical trip through underground realms.

The book blends passages on the nature of physical phenomena, such as gravity and volcanoes, with spiritualist speculation and adventure-story elements (like traversing a landscape of giant mushrooms). The whole ends with a summary from I-Am-The-Man and a conclusion from Drury. Subsequent editions of the book added various prefatory and supplementary materials.

References

External links
 
Project Gutenberg Text
The complete text, readable online
 "The World is My University; or, The Life and Adventures of Dr. John Uri Lloyd, M.D., Ph.D."

1895 American novels
1895 science fiction novels
American science fiction novels
Novels set in subterranea